Chehesh (also known as Chiyesh) is a village in Khorgam Rural District, Khorgam District, Rudbar County, Gilan Province, Iran. At the 2006 census, its population was 460, in 129 families.

References 

Populated places in Rudbar County